The 2012–13 Ascenso MX season took place from 20 July 2012 to 11 May 2013 and was divided into two tournaments named Apertura 2012 and Clausura 2013.  The Ascenso MX is the second-tier football league of Mexico.

The Apertura 2012 winner La Piedad defeated the Clausura 2013 winner Neza in a promotional final and won the ascension to the 2013–14 Liga MX season.

Changes from the previous season

 León were promoted to Liga MX.
 Tecos were relegated from Liga MX.
 Titanes de Tulancingo, winners of Segunda División de México did not obtain a license to compete. The runners-up Tecamachalco also did not obtain a license.  Since no teams were promoted from the Segunda, the total number of teams competing was reduced to fifteen.
 U. de G. avoided relegation due to the disaffiliation to Indios.

Stadia and locations

The following 15 clubs competed in the Liga de Ascenso during the 2012–2013 season:

Torneo Apertura
The 2012 Apertura was the first championship of the season. It began on 20 July 2012 and ended on 1 December 2012.

Standings

Results

 Updated to 4 November 2012.

Liguilla (Playoffs)

The six best teams after the first place play two games against each other on a home-and-away basis. The winner of each match up is determined by aggregate score. If the teams were tied, the Away goals rule appliesd.

The teams were seeded one to seven in quarterfinals, and were re-seeded one to four in semifinals, depending on their position in the general table. The higher seeded teams played on their home field during the second leg.

 If the two teams were tied after both legs, the away goals rule applied. If both teams were still tied, higher seeded team would have advanced.
 Teams were re-seeded every round.
 The winner qualified to the playoff match vs the Clausura 2013 winner. However, if the winner had been the same in both tournaments, they would have been promoted to the 2012–13 Mexican Primera División without playing the Promotional Final

Top goalscorers - Apertura 2012 regular season 
Last updated on 4 November 2012.
Players sorted first by goals scored, then by goal frequency (Minutes played/Goals scored).
In blue, the goal scoring champion(s) of Apertura 2012

Source: Ascenso MX goalscorers official page

Torneo Clausura
The 2013 Clausura was the second championship of the season. It began on 4 January 2013 and ended on 11 May 2013.

Standings

Results

 Updated to 22 January 2013.

Liguilla (Playoffs)

The eight qualified teams played two games against each other on a home-and-away basis. The winner of each match was determined by aggregate score.

The teams were seeded one to eight in the quarterfinals, and were re-seeded one to four in the semifinals, depending on their position in the general table. The higher seeded teams played on their home field during the second leg.

 If the two teams were tied after both legs, the higher seeded team advanced.
 Teams were re-seeded every round.
 The winner qualified to the playoff match vs the Apertura 2012 winner. However, if the winner had been the same in both tournaments, they would have been promoted to the 2013–14 Mexican Primera División season without playing the Promotional Final.

Quarterfinals

First leg

Second leg

Semifinals

First leg

Second leg

Final

First leg

Second leg

Promotional final

First Leg

Second leg

Top goalscorers - Clausura 2013 regular season 
Last Updated on 21 January 2012.
Players sorted first by goals scored, then by goal frequency (Minutes played/Goals scored).

Source: Ascenso MX goalscorers official page - Clausura 2013

Relegation table 
The relegated team had the lowest ratio by adding the points scored in the following tournaments: Apertura 2010, Bicentenario 2011, Apertura 2011 and Clausura 2012 and Apertura 2012 and Clausura 2013.

Source: Ascenso MX relegation table - Clausura 2013

References

External links
Liga MX & Ascenso MX Official Website

2012-13